The Brazilian coral snake (Micrurus decoratus) is a species of coral snake in the family Elapidae.

References 

decoratus
Snakes of South America
Reptiles of Brazil
Endemic fauna of Brazil
Reptiles described in 1858

it is a very venomous snake